The 1936 Rhode Island gubernatorial election was held on November 3, 1936. Democratic nominee Robert E. Quinn defeated Republican nominee Charles P. Sisson with 53.66% of the vote.

General election

Candidates
Major party candidates
Robert E. Quinn, Democratic 
Charles P. Sisson, Republican

Other candidates
Charles F. Bishop, Socialist Labor
James P. Reid, Communist

Results

References

1936
Rhode Island
Gubernatorial